70's Rock Must Die is an EP by Lard, released in 2000.

Track listing

Personnel

Lard 
Al Jourgensen – guitars, keys, programming, production
Paul Barker – bass, keys, programming, backing vocals (1), production
Jello Biafra – Vocals, production

Additional Personnel 
Jeff Ward – drums (1)
Bill Rieflin – drums (3)
Mike Scaccia – guitars (3)
Chuck McMillan – backing vocals (1)
Dirk Flanngan – backing vocals (1)
Jeff "Critter" Newell – engineer, backing vocals (1)
Keith Robbins – backing vocals (1)
Matt Schultz – backing vocals (1)
Steve Silver – backing vocals (1)
Brad Kopplin – engineer

References

2000 EPs
Albums produced by Al Jourgensen
Alternative Tentacles EPs
Lard (band) EPs